Ivonne Coll Mendoza (born June 18, 1947) is a Puerto Rican actress. She was Miss Puerto Rico in 1967 and competed in the Miss Universe pageant the same year. She later became an actress, appearing in films such as The Godfather Part II and Lean on Me and television series including Switched at Birth, Glee, and Teen Wolf. From 2014 to 2019, Coll starred as Alba Villanueva in the CW comedy-drama series Jane the Virgin.

Early years
Coll was born on June 18, 1947 in Fajardo, Puerto Rico, where she received her primary and secondary education. Her mother, Rosita Mendoza, was a celebrated hairstylist in Puerto Rico. She also has a sister, Millie. After Coll was born, her father left Puerto Rico for New York City, leaving Coll and her mother behind. When Coll was 10, she and her family moved to the capital of Puerto Rico, San Juan; they lived in the Río Piedras and Hato Rey municipalities of the city.  Coll was an honor student and graduated from Nuestra Señora del Pilar school. She then enrolled in the University of Puerto Rico (Universidad de Puerto Rico) where she studied Social Sciences. Coll started her career as a fashion model. In 1966, she represented Fajardo in the Miss Puerto Rico pageant and won. Coll remained the only representative from Fajardo to win the national title until Ashley Cariño won in 2022.

Career

1971–1975: Una chica llamada Ivonne Coll

At the end of 1971, the owner of television channel 11 in Puerto Rico, Rafael Perez Perry spotted Coll. His competitor had a show with a young starlet by the name of Iris Chacón. Perez Perry believed that Coll could have a show of her own to compete. Therefore, he sponsored the show which was called Una chica llamada Ivonne Coll (A girl named Ivonne Coll), which ran from 1971 to 1975.

In 1976, Coll moved to Los Angeles, California, where she took dance and singing classes in the Academy of Stage and Cinema Arts. She landed a part in a theater play called "Burning Beach", which was presented in the American Place Theater.

Career in the United States
In 1979, Coll moved back to New York, where she participated in various Off Broadway productions such as: Spain 1980, As You Like It, Romeo and Juliet, and Macbeth. In New York, film director Francis Ford Coppola recruited her for the role of "Yolanda", a Havana night club singer in The Godfather II. Although her role was small, the experience would serve her well in the future. She was credited as "Yvonne Coll".

In 1989, Coll played a minor role of a teacher named Mrs. Santos, in the film Lean on Me written by Michael Schiffer, directed by John G. Avildsen and starring Morgan Freeman. She participated in the following productions: Orinoco, The Masses Are Asses (a play by Pedro Pietri), Medio Comuñas, Goodbye Castro, and Pancho Diablo (with Fernando Allende and Sully Diaz).

Coll won an ACE Award for best actress for Orinoco. When not acting, Coll attended the HB Studio and  Lee Strasberg's Acting Studio. Among the television series on which she appeared were: Pacific Blue, Crisis Center, An American Family, The Bold and the Beautiful, Chicago Hope, Malibu Shores, NYPD Blue, L.A. Law, and Under Cover.

Return to Puerto Rico
When Coll returned to Puerto Rico, she was invited to participate in La verdadera historia de Pedro Navaja and Paper Flowers. She had a role in the locally produced film, La gran Fiesta (The Grand Party), and in the TV show Cuqui. In 2002, she appeared in the film Besos de Fuego. 

In October 2006, Coll played the title role in Bertolt Brecht's Mother Courage at the Berkeley Rep Theater in Berkeley, California. From 2011 to 2014, she had the recurring roles on Switched at Birth, Glee, and Teen Wolf. Beginning in the fall of 2014, Coll become part of the main cast as Alba Villanueva, grandmother of Jane Villanueva, in the CW comedy series, Jane the Virgin. 

In 2015, Coll was honored by the organizers of the National Puerto Rican Day Parade with a lifetime achievement award for her long and varied career.

In 2019, Coll moved back permanently to Puerto Rico.

Personal life

Coll has never married and has no children.

Filmography

Film

Television

See also
 
List of Puerto Ricans
Irish immigration to Puerto Rico
History of women in Puerto Rico

Notes

References

External links
 

1947 births
Living people
People from Fajardo, Puerto Rico
20th-century Puerto Rican actresses
21st-century Puerto Rican actresses
Miss Puerto Rico winners
Miss Universe 1967 contestants
20th-century Puerto Rican women singers
Puerto Rican film actresses
Puerto Rican people of Irish descent
Puerto Rican soap opera actresses
Puerto Rican stage actresses
Puerto Rican television actresses
University of Puerto Rico alumni